Acanthocheilidae is a family of nematodes belonging to the order Rhabditida.

Genera:
 Acanthocheilus  Molin, 1858
 Mawsonascaris  Sprent, 1990
 Pseudanisakis  Layman & Borovkova, 1926

References

Nematodes